The Amity Affliction is an Australian metalcore band from Gympie, Queensland, formed in 2003. The band's current line-up consists of Ahren Stringer (bass, clean vocals), Joel Birch (lead vocals), Dan Brown (guitar) and Joe Longobardi (drums). The Amity Affliction has released seven studio albums including Severed Ties (2008), Youngbloods (2010), Chasing Ghosts (2012), Let the Ocean Take Me (2014), This Could Be Heartbreak (2016) and Misery (2018), the latter four debuting at number one on the ARIA charts. They are known for their highly personal songs, often dealing with depression, anxiety, death, substance abuse, and suicide, many lyrics stemming from vocalist Joel Birch's past struggles. The Amity Affliction released their album, Everyone Loves You... Once You Leave Them, on 21 February 2020.

History

Formation and early releases (2003–2008)
The Amity Affliction formed in Gympie, a South-East Queensland town in Australia by friends Ahren Stringer, Joseph Lilwall and Troy Brady in their final year of high school. The band was named for a close friend of the band, who died in a car accident at the age of 17. 'Amity' referred to the friendship and 'Affliction' was to indicate the struggle which dealing with the death caused the band members.
Whilst still at High School, the band spent many times playing at school concerts and lunch breaks.

In 2004, The Amity Affliction released a three track self-titled demo produced by Scott Mullane at Aisle 6 Recording. At the time there were four members with former members Garth Buchanan on bass and Lachlan Faulkner on drums. 
In late 2004, vocalist Joel Birch joined the band. Following, mid-2005, The Amity Affliction released their debut self-titled EP. After the release of the EP they toured the East Coast on their 2005 East Coast Tour.

In 2007, there was a line up change when Lachlan Faulkner quit and Garth Buchanan left to join Behind Crimson Eyes. Lachlan Faulkner later joined Saint Lucia. They then hired drummer, Troels Thomasson, Chris Burt on guitar (originally on bass), Ahren Stringer now on bass and the addition of a keyboardist, Trad Nathan. The Amity Affliction released a new five track EP entitled High Hopes which was named for the house in which The Amityville Horror took place. The first pressing came in a CD/DVD package. The DVD featured the band discussing the recording of the EP, it also featured the band on the road and performing.

Severed Ties (2008–2010)
The band released their debut studio album in 2008, entitled Severed Ties. The album spent a week on the Australian Albums Chart at number 26.

It is the first album to feature Chris Burt's brother Ryan Burt on drums. The album features guest vocals from Michael Crafter of I Killed the Prom Queen/Confession, Matthew Wright of the Getaway Plan, JJ Peters of I Killed the Prom Queen/Deez Nuts/Grips 'N' Tonic, Helmet Roberts and Lochlan Watt (Nuclear Summer). A music video was released for the song Fruity Lexia. The Amity Affliction played numerous shows across Sydney, Melbourne, Brisbane, Adelaide and Perth.

During May 2009, they supported the Getaway Plan along with Perth band Elora Danan, on the Getaway Plan's national Finale Tour.

The Amity Affliction undertook a headlining tour across Australia in 2009. They also played the 2009 Stairway to Hell Tour across Australia with support from UK band We Are the Ocean and Melbourne band Hopeless, with a local support band for each city. The Amity Affliction then went to the UK for a full tour supporting We Are the Ocean alongside Flood of Red and All Forgotten.

Youngbloods and Glory Days (2010–2011)
In late 2009, The Amity Affliction parted ways with guitarist Christopher Burt. The decision was mutual and had been planned for some time. His last show was in London in December 2009. While all the members are still good friends with Chris, the decision was made in the best interest of the band musically. Chris now plays guitar and sings in Brisbane based band SENSaii. Afterwards, Clint Ellis (Splattering) from the Getaway Plan took his place.

In April 2010, the band flew out to New York to record their second full-length record with producer Machine. On 10 May, the band uploaded a new song from this album, "I Hate Hartley" on their MySpace and the song was later available for free download.

On a pushed-forward date on 18 June as announced on their website (originally 25 June 2010), the band released their second studio album Youngbloods on Boomtown and Shock Records. The album was a huge success for the band, receiving critical acclaim and debuting at number 6 on the ARIA charts. The Amity Affliction went on tour in July to support the release of their second album. Joining them was Misery Signals, fellow Australians Confession and Scottish band Flood of Red. They toured Western Australia a few weeks later, joined by local band Break Even.

In October, the band announced they would be releasing Glory Days, which would be a compilation of old demos and the first two EPs as well as two B-sides from Youngbloods. Glory Days was released on 26 November. They then announced a UK tour with Asking Alexandria and one following with long-time friends Deez Nuts, Endwell and Louie Knuxx.

In the autumn of 2010, The Amity Affliction had their first American interview with alternative scene magazine Substream Music Press for its 22nd issue, just after signing to The Artery Foundation. The band found out they would be performing at the next Soundwave festival during the actual interview for the article.

On 30 May 2011, the band released their second music video from Youngbloods; following the music video for "I Hate Hartley", the new music video for the song "Youngbloods" was released exclusively on Guvera.com.

In late 2011, the band embarked on their headline nationwide tour, Fuck the Reaper, with supporting acts Asking Alexandria, Skyway and a local band in each city.

Chasing Ghosts (2012–2013)
During the 17 September 2011 show in Townsville, Queensland, vocalist Joel Birch announced that they were planning to head over to America early 2012 to record their third album.

Then again on 22 September 2011, Ahren stated in an interview with Alt Music Hub that the band planned to begin recording their new album in March/April 2012.

On 8 February 2012, it was announced that The Amity Affliction had been signed to Roadrunner Records for their next album and future.

On 7 May 2012, the band headed over to Orlando, Florida to start recording their third album with producer Michael Baskette.

On 7 June 2012, it was announced the band's third studio album would be titled Chasing Ghosts and was set to be released on 7 September 2012 in Australia, 17 September for the UK, and 18 September for the US.

It was revealed in a news article and magazine cover posted on 13/14 August that guitarist Imran Siddiqi would no longer be a part of the band. Furthermore, Siddiqi then did not appear in the video clip for the single "Chasing Ghosts" released on 15 August. A fill in guitarist played their album tour and U.S tour in late 2012.

After the release of Chasing Ghosts, the band had an Australian nationwide tour in September–October promoting their new album with supporting acts the Ghost Inside, Architects and Buried in Verona. Amity appeared on Soundwave in 2013 in February–March and also Warped Tour Australia at the end of the year.

It was announced by Joel Birch on 24 March 2013 that Dan Brown was the new guitarist, although he did not appear on the "Open Letter" music video.

In 2013, The Amity Affliction was part of Warped Tour in the United States with Chad Hasty (Glass Cloud) on drums and percussion due to Ryan Burt severely damaging his cornea during a set in Portland, Oregon. Later in the tour vocalist Joel Birch was also hospitalized due to unspecified illness, forcing the band to cancel their set in Pittsburgh. The band's next show in Cleveland was played due to the help of Sam Carter (Architects), Jason Aalon Butler (Letlive) and Chris Roetter (Like Moths to Flames) sharing the stage as replacement vocals for Joel. All shows after this were played with Joel back on vocals after his recovery.

Let the Ocean Take Me (2014–2015) 

Late in 2013 the band went on to play the "Brothers in Arms" tour across Europe and Australia with support acts Landscapes and in Hearts Wake for the European portion and Chelsea Grin, Stick to Your Guns and in Hearts Wake for the Australian segment. In late 2013, the band released a demo of the song "Cave In". The single was speculated to be featured on the upcoming album. However, this was proved false when the band announced the track list for their upcoming fourth studio album. The first single from the bands forthcoming album titled "Pittsburgh" was released on 14 April. The second single "Don't Lean on Me" was released on 15 May. The album itself, titled Let the Ocean Take Me, was released on 6 June in Australia, 9 June in the UK, and 10 June in the U.S. it debuted at No. 1 on the Australian ARIA albums chart, becoming the band's second consecutive No. 1.

On 11 October, lead guitarist Troy Brady announced that he had decided to leave the band, making Ahren Stringer the only original member left in the band.

On 18 May 2015, The Amity Affliction released a trailer for their upcoming documentary film titled Seems Like Forever on YouTube. The video description contains links to pre-order the film, released on 10 July 2015 as a stand-alone DVD or a deluxe two-disc edition CD version of Let the Ocean Take Me, including two unreleased tracks, "Skeletons" (featured in the trailer) and "Farewell".

The band played the full Vans Warped Tour, and in October–November 2015 headlined in the U.S. with the "Seems Like Forever U.S. Tour" with Chelsea Grin, Secrets, Cruel Hand and The Plot in You. In mid-November, a new, non-album single "Shine On" was premiered on radio and released digitally without prior announcement. It reached the top five on the Australian iTunes chart and debuted at No. 19 on the ARIA singles chart, the band's highest. The band also co-headlined the "Big Ass Tour" with A Day to Remember, Motionless in White and Hands Like Houses in Australia and New Zealand in December 2015.

This Could Be Heartbreak (2016–2017) 
On 18 May, The Amity Affliction posted a video to their Facebook page announcing their fifth studio album, This Could Be Heartbreak. It was also announced that the album would be released on 12 August and the band also released the music video for the first single, "I Bring the Weather with Me". The song also features clean vocals from Joel Birch. Along with this new album, The Amity Affliction also announced a 1500-person capacity (per city) tour in Australia called the I Bring the Weather with Me Tour at The Tivoli in Brisbane on 19 August, Metro Theatre in Sydney on 26 August and 170 Russell in Melbourne on 31 August. Supporting them on this tour will be Trophy Eyes. They will also tour the United States during September and October and then Europe in December for the record. On 10 July the band released their second single for the album, the title track "This Could Be Heartbreak" along with a music video. On 9 August, the band released a lyric video for the song "All Fucked Up" on YouTube.
The band was also featured on the Fearless compilation Punk Goes Pop Vol. 7, covering the Weeknd's song "Can't Feel My Face". A music video for the cover was released on 22 June 2017. The Amity Affliction officially announced that Ryan Burt departed from the band due to mental health reasons on 5 February 2018.

Misery (2018–2019) 
On 20 June 2018, The Amity Affliction released the first single, "Ivy (Doomsday)", from their upcoming sixth studio album, Misery. The band announced that the album will be released on 24 August through Roadrunner Records. The band released an official video along with the release of "Ivy (Doomsday)". The band released the song "Feels Like I'm Dying" as a second part to the "Ivy (Doomsday)" video. The official track listing was eventually revealed on the band's website. It is their fourth consecutive album to reach number one on the Aria Albums Chart.

On 29 January 2019, the band released a music video for "Drag the Lake", the first to feature new drummer Joe Longobardi of Defeater fame, who replaced Ryan Burt after he departed the band back in 2018. In September the band will complete an East Coast Tour of Australia with Underoath, Crossfaith and Pagan.

Everyone Loves You... Once You Leave Them (2019–2021)
On 6 September 2019, the band released their new song, "All My Friends Are Dead" accompanied with a music video. The song marks a return to the band's heavier elements; it is their first release under Pure Noise Records. On 31 December, it was revealed that the band would be releasing their new album on 21 February after the German version of Amazon accidentally leaked the product listing for the effort. The band have also released a sneak peek of an upcoming track from the album.

On 8 January 2020, the band confirmed their seventh album, Everyone Loves You... Once You Leave Them, would be released on 21 February 2020, along with unveiling the track list for the album. Along with the confirmation of the album they released the second single from the outing, "Soak Me in Bleach", accompanied with a music video.

On 29 January, the band released the next single from the album, "Catatonia", which harks back to their earlier heavier sound. On 20 October, the band released two B-Side songs that didn't make it on their seventh album, Everyone Loves You... Once You Leave Them called "Midnight Train" and "Don't Wade in the Water".

Somewhere Beyond the Blue (2021–2022)
On 15 September 2021, the band released the first single "Like Love" alongside an accompanying music video. On 17 November, a follow-up single titled "Give Up the Ghost" was released. Ahren Stringer told Wall of Sound during an interview: "We are really enjoying playing the heavier stuff again. Seems our audience is happy with that as well…"

On 15 December, the band released "Death Is All Around", the third and final track from their EP Somewhere Beyond the Blue which was released on 15 December 2021 and features unclean vocal performances by both Joel Birch and Ahren Stringer. When discussing the new single, Ahren revealed: "We're deep into a pandemic that won't go away, with lockdowns still happening here in Australia and no touring in sight, it's a hopeless situation and one that inspired the lyrics in this song."

Not Without My Ghosts (2022-present)
On 29 November 2022, the band released unveiled a brand new single "Show Me Your God" and its corresponding music video. On 13 February 2023, the band published another single "I See Dead People" featuring Louie Knuxx along with an accompanying music video.

Controversy
Shortly after the announcement of the Chasing Ghosts album, the album's cover was revealed. The cover depicts a man hanging from a tree who is thought to have committed suicide. The graphic nature of this image caused much controversy among social media. The situation was very ironic due to the main message behind the album being anti-suicide and urging fans who feel suicidal to turn to people close to them and seeking help rather than taking their own life. The band later apologized for the artwork along with the responses band members made to fans regarding the artwork.

Slight controversy sparked during the Warped Tour 2013, when in the middle of a set Joel Birch called out the frontman of Memphis May Fire, Matty Mullins, on supposed sexist comments that had been made to female attendance at Warped. The frontman then went on to continue talking about racist taunts that had been made towards the band's replacement drummer/percussionist for the tour, Chad Hasty.

Band members

Current members
 Ahren Stringer – co-lead vocals (2003–present); bass (2007–present); rhythm guitar (2003–2007)
 Joel Birch – lead vocals (2004–present)
 Dan Brown – rhythm guitar (2013–present; touring musician 2012–2013); lead guitar, backing vocals (2014–present) 
 Joe Longobardi – drums (2018–present; touring musician 2018)

Former members
 Lachlan Faulkner – drums (2003–2005)
 Garth Buchanan – bass (2003–2007); backing vocals (2003–2004)
 Troels Thomasen – drums (2005–2008)
 Chris Burt – rhythm guitar (2007–2009); bass guitar (2007)
 Clint Owen Ellis –  lead guitar (2009–2011)
 Trad Nathan – keyboards (2006–2011)
 Imran Siddiqi – rhythm guitar (2011–2012)
 Troy Brady – lead guitar (2003–2009, 2011–2014); backing vocals (2003–2004); rhythm guitar (2009–2011, 2012–2013)
 Ryan Burt – drums (2008–2018)

Touring musicians
 Kyle Yocum – guitars (2015–2017)
 Troy Wright – drums (2017–2018)
 Casey McHale – drums (2016–2017, 2018)
 Joseph Arrington – drums (2018)

Timeline

Discography

Studio albums
Severed Ties (2008)
Youngbloods (2010)
Chasing Ghosts (2012)
Let the Ocean Take Me (2014)
This Could Be Heartbreak (2016)
Misery (2018)
Everyone Loves You... Once You Leave Them (2020)

Awards

APRA Awards
The APRA Awards are several award ceremonies run in Australia by the Australasian Performing Right Association (APRA) to recognise composing and song writing skills, sales and airplay performance by its members annually. 

|-
| 2021 || "Soak Me in Bleach" || Most Performed Rock Work || 
|-

ARIA Music Awards
The ARIA Music Awards is an annual awards ceremony that recognises excellence, innovation, and achievement across all genres of Australian music. The Amity Affliction has 5 nominations from this category.

|-
| 2010
| Youngbloods
| rowspan="5"| Best Hard Rock or Heavy Metal Album
| 
|-
| 2013
| Chasing Ghosts
| 
|-
| 2014
| Let the Ocean Take Me
| 
|-
| 2016
| This Could Be Heartbreak
| 
|-
| 2020
| Everyone Loves You... Once You Leave Them
| 
|-

Queensland Music Awards
The Queensland Music Awards (previously known as Q Song Awards) are annual awards celebrating Queensland, Australia's brightest emerging artists and established legends. They commenced in 2006.

|-
| 2011
| The Amity Affliction
| The Courier-Mail People's Choice Award Most Popular Group 
| 
|-
| 2013
| "Chasing Ghosts"
| Heavy Song of the Year
| 
|-
| 2015
| The Amity Affliction
| The BOQ People's Choice Award Most Popular Group 
| 
|-
| rowspan="2" | 2017
| The Amity Affliction
| Export Achievement Award
| 
|-
| This Could Be Heartbreak
| Highest Selling Album
| 
|}

Further reading
Side projects
Vocalist Joel Birch also fronts hardcore band named The Author.
Bassist/clean vocalist Ahren Stringer and former keyboardist Trad Nathan had a short lived electro/techno style side project named Lovecats.
Stringer appeared on Australian rapper Illy's single "Youngbloods".
Former member Trad Nathan is now in a band called Swear Words.
Former member Christopher Burt now plays guitar and sings in Brisbane Band named SENSaii.
Ahren Stringer started rapping as a part of Royal Family with his girlfriend "Lady KC".
Notes

References
General
The Amity Affliction on Myspace
An Interview with The Amity Affliction
The Amity Affliction on Facebook
The Amity Affliction cited as Melodic Hardcore
Melodic Hardcore 3
Specific

External links 
 

Musical groups established in 2004
Australian metalcore musical groups
Australian post-hardcore musical groups
Roadrunner Records artists
Pure Noise Records artists
Queensland musical groups
Gympie